Dead like Me: Life After Death is a 2009 American fantasy comedy-drama film directed by Stephen Herek and written by John Masius and Stephen Godchaux, based on the short-lived 2003 television series Dead Like Me created by Bryan Fuller.

Following the end of the series, the "reapers" have a new boss, Kane, who leads them astray from the rules they followed (mostly) in the TV series. Lead character "George" is fired from her job at Happy Time and ends up revealing her identity to her sister, Reggie. George's fellow reapers confront Kane and find that he knows and does not care that their departure from the job rules is causing misfortune elsewhere. Unhappy with his leadership, they try various ways to end his existence. George gets her Happy Time job back, and the reapers await a new boss.

Laura Harris was unavailable to return as Daisy Adair, and Sarah Wynter replaced her. The rest of the returning cast reprised their roles, with new character Cameron Kane played by Henry Ian Cusick. The film was released on DVD on February 17, 2009, one month after its debut on Canada's Super Channel.

Plot
A crew of "reapers", whose job is to extract the souls of people who are about to die, find themselves confronted by change as their habitual meeting place (Der Waffle Haus) burns down the same day their boss and head reaper (Rube) disappears (having "gotten his lights"). They soon meet their new boss, Cameron Kane (Henry Ian Cusick), a slick businessman who died falling from the World Trade Center on September 11, 2001. He outfits them with color-coordinated smartphones and treats them to luxurious accommodations – teaching them, as Roxy (Jasmine Guy) puts it later, that "nothing we do here matters." This tutelage leads the reapers to perform such misdeeds as saving those they were to reap (Roxy), abusing immortality for financial gain (Mason, played by Callum Blue), letting a soul wander, instead of showing him "his lights" (Daisy, now played by Sarah Wynter), and otherwise selfishly focusing on their wants.

Georgia "George" Lass (Ellen Muth), the movie's narrator, is fired from Happy Time (a temp agency) after she loudly chews out an employee for delivering a report late. The employee quits and later sues for harassment. George ends up revealing her identity to her sister Reggie (Britt McKillip). George finds herself reminiscing with Reggie, helping Reggie prepare for the death of her boyfriend, Hudson Hart (Jordan Hudyma).

George's fellow reapers confront Kane and learn that he had realized and did not care that the "pebbles" of their misdeeds would cause "waves" of misfortune elsewhere. Unhappy with his style of management, they try to deduce how exactly a fellow reaper can be killed. They shoot and drown him to no effect before finally dismembering and cremating him. His ashes are then shot into orbit along with those of Murray, the cat belonging to George's boss Delores. At the launch, Delores tells George that the employee who had sued her for harassment had done so at several of the employee's previous jobs, and George is reinstated, now with a corner office.

The reapers walk away from the launch, wondering who their new boss will be. George, after seeing her sister and mother drive off on vacation, finds herself suddenly showered with Post-Its falling from the sky, like the Post-Its their former leader Rube had used to deliver their reaping assignments. Realizing she has been selected as the group's new leader, she says, "I am so fucked" as the camera pulls away from the Earth into orbit.

Cast 
Ellen Muth as Georgia Lass
Callum Blue as Mason
Sarah Wynter as Daisy Adair
Jasmine Guy as Roxy Harvey
Britt McKillip as Reggie Lass
Shenae Grimes as Jennifer Hardick
Christine Willes as Delores Herbig
Cynthia Stevenson as Joy Lass
Henry Ian Cusick as Cameron Kane
 Jordan Hudyma as Hudson Hart

Casting 
In June 2007, a casting call was posted on an entertainment industry website for the role of Daisy Adair, formerly played by Laura Harris, who was unable to reprise the role due to commitments with Women's Murder Club. It noted that John Masius wrote the film and also confirmed that Mandy Patinkin, who starred in the original series, was not in the film. In August 2007, it was confirmed that Sarah Wynter would take over the role of Daisy Adair from Laura Harris. Harris and Wynter previously played sisters in the second season of 24. Henry Ian Cusick would play a new character named Cameron Kane.

Release 
The film's release date was set for July 2008 and later rescheduled and released on February 17, 2009. An exclusive television debut occurred on January 16, 2009, on SuperChannel in Canada. It has also been shown in the United States on Syfy.

References

External links
 
 

Dead Like Me
2009 films
2009 comedy-drama films
2009 direct-to-video films
2009 fantasy films
2000s fantasy comedy-drama films
American direct-to-video films
American fantasy comedy-drama films
Direct-to-video comedy films
Direct-to-video drama films
Direct-to-video fantasy films
Films about death
Films based on television series
Films directed by Stephen Herek
Films scored by Kevin Kiner
Films set in Seattle
Films shot in Montreal
Metro-Goldwyn-Mayer direct-to-video films
Films about personifications of death
2000s English-language films
2000s American films